Wallace's fairywren (Sipodotus wallacii) is a species of bird in the Australasian wren family, Maluridae. It is monotypic within the genus Sipodotus. It is found in New Guinea and the Aru Islands, where its natural habitat is subtropical or tropical moist lowland forests.

Taxonomy and systematics
The Wallace's fairywren is the only member of the monotypic genus Sipodotus.

Wallace's fairywren was originally described in the genus Todopsis as Todopsis wallacii by G. R. Gray in 1862 on the basis of specimens collected by Charles Allen on Misool Island. Specimens from the Aru Islands were described as Todopsis coronata by John Gould in 1878. Mathews established the monotypic genus Sipodotus for the Wallace's fairywren in 1928 on the basis of the shape of the bill and the nearly identical plumages of the male and female of the species. The species has also been placed in the genus Malurus. When the species is placed in the genus Malurus, the subspecific name coronatus is preoccupied and is replaced with capillatus, coined by Mayr in 1986.

The species' specific epithet is named after Alfred Russel Wallace, a British naturalist, explorer, geographer, and biologist. the generic name Sipodotus is an anagram of Todopsis. Alternate names for Wallace's fairywren include the blue-capped fairywren, Wallace's wren, and Wallace's wren-warbler.

Like other Australasian wrens, Wallace's fairywren is not related to the true wrens. The fairywrens were initially thought to be related to Muscicapidae (old-world flycatchers) or Sylviidae (warblers), before being placed in the Maluridae in 1975. Recently, DNA analysis has shown the Maluridae to be a part of the superfamily Meliphagoidea with the Pardalotidae (pardalotes) and the Meliphagidae (honeyeaters).

Subspecies 
There are two recognized subspecies:

 S. w. wallacii - Gray, G.R., 1862: The nominate subspecies, it occurs on Misool and Yapen Island, the Bird's Head Peninsula, and on the north coast of New Guinea, east from Geelvink Bay.
 S. w. coronatus - Gould, 1878: Occurs on the Aru Islands, in southern New Guinea from the Setekwa River to Milne Bay, and north to the Hydrographer Mountains. When the species is placed in Malurus, the subspecies is known as S. w. capillatus. Females have less buff on the throat and breast than in the nominate subspecies.

Description 
Wallace's fairywren is a small species of fairywren,  in length and weighing . Adult males have a black crown and nape with blue feather tips and a black face with an incomplete white eye-ring and white ear-tufts. The scapulars and back are rusty brown, with brownish-grey upperwings, white underparts, and brown tails. The black beak is long, broad, straight, and bluntly pointed, with a white tip. The iris is red-brown, with short, flesh-brown legs. Females are similar to males, but have a pale yellowish wash to the throat and a duller crown. Subspecies coronatus has a creamy wash to the underparts. Immatures are duller than the adults, with shorter bills and ear-coverts, along with having the crown be speckled buff instead of blue.

Little is known about its vocalisations, but hissing see see see see calls are given by foraging parties.

Distribution and habitat 
Wallace's fairywren is endemic to New Guinea. It is common throughout New Guinea, except on the Huon Peninsula, eastern Sepik-Ramu, and most of the northern parts of the southeastern peninsula.

They most commonly inhabit trees with tangles of vines and climbing bamboo at forest edges.

Behaviour and ecology

Breeding 
Breeding occurs throughout the year, with a peak in September-December. Out of three observed nests, two were attended by three adults each. Nests are domed structures, with a hooded side entrance near the top, and are made out of fine grass, cobwebs, and strips of palm frond, lined with finer fibres and sometimes covered with bits of moss and epiphytes. Eggs are thought to be laid in clutches of two. Chicks are fed by both parents once they hatch.

Diet 
Wallace's fairywrens are thought to be mainly insectivorous, feeding on insects and spiders. They forage by gleaning and probing in forest tangles and thickets. It has been known to forage with mixed species flocks, typically in family groups of 4-8 individuals.

Status 
Wallace's fairywren is listed as least concern by the IUCN due to its large range and lack of significant population declines. They are common throughout foothill rainforest in their range. However, large-scale clearing of rainforest may be a potential threat.

References

Cited text

External links
Image at ADW

Wallace's fairywren
Birds of New Guinea
Wallace's fairywren
Wallace's fairywren
Taxonomy articles created by Polbot